Eurydice (Greek: Εὐρυδίκη Eurydike; died 317 BC) was the Queen of Macedon, wife of Philip III and daughter of Amyntas IV (son of Perdiccas III)  and Cynane (daughter of Philip II and his first wife Audata).

Biography

Early life
Eurydice's birth name appears to have been Adea; the sources are silent on when it was changed to Eurydice. She was brought up by her mother Cynane, and seems to have been trained by her mother in masculine and martial exercises.

She accompanied her mother on her daring expedition to Asia; and when Cynane was put to death by Alcetas, the discontent expressed by the troops, and the respect with which they looked on Eurydice as one of the surviving members of the royal house, induced the imperial regent, Perdiccas, not only to spare her life, but to give her in marriage to King Philip Arrhidaeus, Alexander the Great's half-brother and successor to the throne of Macedon, as had been Cynane's plan.  Sources hint that this was an unequal marriage, because the king was disabled mentally.  Furthermore, although Philip Arrhidaeus was king of Macedon, this did not make him the imperial successor to Alexander; Alexander had won his empire by law of conquest, and the Asian portion of the empire (more than nine-tenths of the whole) was not part of the people of Macedon.

Queen of Macedon
The sources are again silent as to Eurydice during the life of Perdiccas; but after his death, in 321 BC Eurydice bid for power: she demanded that the new regents of Macedon, Peithon and Arrhidaeus, grant her a share of the regency.  Eurydice's ties to the Macedonian army, and her status as king's wife, helped her gain influence and succeeded briefly in becoming a sort of de facto regent.  She took an active part in the proceedings at the Treaty of Triparadisus in 321 BC.

It was at this point, however, that a new adversary, Alexander the Great's general Antipater, returned to the king's court and laid claim to the vacant regency.  In an attempt to forestall this and retain command over the Macedonian army, Eurydice spoke in public to the assembled soldiery, who were restless due to Antipater's inability to pay them. Eurydice's speech failed; the Macedonian army decided in favor of Antipater, and the general was appointed regent and guardian of the king.

Eurydice, once again relatively powerless, accompanied her husband and Antipater to Macedon. But the death of Antipater in 319 BC, the more feeble character of Polyperchon, who succeeded him as regent, and the failure of his enterprises in Greece, and above all, the favourable disposition he evinced towards Olympias, determined her again to take an active part: she concluded an alliance with Cassander, and, as he was wholly occupied with the affairs of Greece, she herself assembled an army and took the field in person. Polyperchon advanced against her from Epirus, accompanied by Aeacides, the king of that country, and Olympias, as well as by Roxana and her infant son. But the presence of Olympias was alone sufficient to decide the contest: the Macedonian troops refused to fight against the mother of Alexander the Great, and went over to her side. Eurydice fled from the field of battle to Amphipolis, but was seized and made prisoner.

Imprisonment and execution
She was at first confined, together with her husband, in a narrow dungeon, and scantily supplied with food; but soon Olympias, becoming alarmed at the compassion excited among the Macedonians, determined to get rid of her rival, and sent the young queen in her prison a sword, a rope, and a cup of hemlock, with orders to choose her mode of death. The spirit of Eurydice remained unbroken to the last; she still breathed defiance to Olympias, and prayed that she might soon be requited with the like gifts; then, having paid as well as she could the last duties to her husband, she put an end to her own life by hanging, without giving way to a tear or word of lamentation. Her body was afterwards removed by Cassander, and interred, together with that of her husband, with royal pomp at Aegae.

References

Further reading

 

Popular literature
Renault, Mary. Funeral Games.  New York: Pantheon Books, 1981.

4th-century BC births
317 BC deaths
Women in Hellenistic warfare
Ancient Macedonian queens consort
4th-century BC Greek people
4th-century BC Macedonians
4th-century BC Greek women
People who died under the regency of Polyperchon
Executed royalty of Macedonia (ancient kingdom)
Suicides by hanging in Greece
Forced suicides
Ancient Macedonians who committed suicide
Executed royalty